Beisel may refer to:
 Beisel (car), a 1914 cyclecar manufactured in Monroe, Michigan
 Beisel-Mitchell House, a historic house in Paragould, Arkansas

People
 Christian Beisel (born 1982), German football player
 Elizabeth Beisel (born 1992), American competition swimmer
 Monty Beisel (born 1978), American football player
 Rex Beisel (1893–1972), American aeronautical engineer and pioneer in the science and industry of aviation